The 1991–92 Women's European Champions Cup was the 31st edition of Europe's competition for national champions women's handball clubs, taking place between September 1991 and 18 April 1992. Hypo Niederösterreich defeated defending champion TV Giessen-Lützellinden in a rematch of the previous edition's final to win its third title.

Qualifying round

First round

Quarter-finals

Semifinals

Final

References

Women's EHF Champions League
Ihf Women's European Cup, 1991-92
Ihf Women's European Cup, 1991-92
Eur
Eur